Marco Völler (born 6 January 1989) is a German professional basketball player who last played for the Skyliners Frankfurt of the German League Basketball Bundesliga.

Voller averaged 4.5 points and 3.3 rebounds per game for the Skyliners in the 2019-20 season. He re-signed with the team on 13 August 2020.

Personal
Völler played soccer until age 14 when he discovered his love for basketball.

He is the son of former German soccer star and national team coach Rudi Völler.

References

External links
Basketball Bundesliga Profile
Sport.de Profile
Eurobasket.com Profile

1989 births
Living people
Forwards (basketball)
German men's basketball players
Giessen 46ers players
Sportspeople from Offenbach am Main
Rockets (basketball club) players
Skyliners Frankfurt players
White Wings Hanau players